Leticia Quezada Contreras (born 25 October 1979) is a Mexican politician from the Party of the Democratic Revolution. From 2009 to 2012 she served as Deputy of the LXI Legislature of the Mexican Congress representing the Federal District.

References

1979 births
Living people
Politicians from Mexico City
Women members of the Chamber of Deputies (Mexico)
Party of the Democratic Revolution politicians
21st-century Mexican politicians
21st-century Mexican women politicians
Members of the Congress of Mexico City
Deputies of the LXI Legislature of Mexico
Members of the Chamber of Deputies (Mexico) for Mexico City